IFK Haninge is a Swedish football club located in Haninge in Stockholm County.

Background
Since their foundation Brandbergens IF is now IFK Haninge and has participated mainly in the lower divisions of the Swedish football league system.  The club currently plays in Division 2 Södra Svealand which is the 4th tier of Swedish football. Next year the will play in Division 1 north. They play their home matches at the Torvalla IP in Haninge, Stockholm.

Brandbergens IF are affiliated to Stockholms Fotbollförbund.

Before the 2012 season, Brandbergens IF merged into one club called IFK Haninge. After 2015 season it was announced that the team will be renamed from IFK Haninge-Brandbergen to just IFK Haninge with a new team logo.

Current squad
As of 2 May 2018

Recent history
In recent seasons IFK Haninge/Brandbergens IF have competed in the following divisions:

2020 - Division 1 Norra
2019 - Division 2 Södra Svealand
2018 - Division 2 Södra Svealand
2017 - Division 2 Södra Svealand
2016 - Division 3 Södra Svealand
2015 - Division 3 Södra Svealand
2014 - Division 3 Södra Svealand
2013 - Division 3 Södra Svealand
2012 - Division 3 Södra Svealand
2011 - Division 3 Södra Svealand
2010 - Division 4 Stockholm Södra
2009 - Division 5 Stockholm Södra
2008 - Division 6 Stockholm E
2007 - Division 6 Stockholm D
2006 - Division 7 Stockholm G
2005 - Division 7 Stockholm G
2004 - Division 7 Stockholm G
2003 - Division 7 Stockholm F
2002 - Division 7 Stockholm G
2001 - Division 7 Stockholm F
2000 - Division 7 Stockholm G
1999 - Division 7 Stockholm F

Attendances

In recent seasons Brandbergens IF have had the following average attendances:

Footnotes

External links
Official website 
 

Football clubs in Stockholm
Haninge Brandbergen